Hurricane Bertha was an intense and early-forming major hurricane that affected areas from the Leeward Islands to the United States in July of the 1996 Atlantic hurricane season. The second named storm, first hurricane, and first major hurricane during the season. Bertha originated from a tropical wave that moved off the coast of Africa in early July. Steadily organizing while moving generally towards the west, the disturbance was designated as a tropical depression at 0000 UTC on July 5, and was further upgraded to a tropical storm by 1200 UTC later that day. Over the next few days, continued intensification occurred, and Bertha became a Category 1 hurricane on the Saffir-Simpson hurricane scale, the first hurricane of the season, prior to moving through the northern Leeward Islands. Moving around the western periphery of the subtropical ridge, Bertha passed north of the Bahamas as a weakening hurricane before turning towards the north-northeast and undergoing another period of rapid intensification. Gradual weakening ensued the following day as Bertha moved up the Mid-Atlantic and into New England before becoming an extratropical cyclone on July 14. The storm's remnants persisted for another several days, before dissipating on July 18.

As Bertha passed through the northern Leeward Islands, it caused moderate to severe damage. In the United States Virgin Islands, heavy rainfall, hurricane-force winds, and significant property damage was reported. In addition, many boats were destroyed, and total damage was estimated near $7.5 million (1996 USD). In Puerto Rico, effects from Bertha were very similar to those in the U.S. Virgin Islands. Heavy rainfall was recorded, peaking over half a foot in isolated areas. Despite this, reports of widespread inland flooding were scarce. Tropical storm-force winds were observed, which is the cause of two indirect fatalities, when they died in a traffic accident. One death was directly attributed to Bertha when a tourist drowned in rough seas in Luquillo, Puerto Rico. Damage in Puerto Rico was also estimated to be near $7.5 million. The most devastating effects from the hurricane occurred in the United States, more specifically the state of North Carolina. Several fishing piers, marinas, and boats were destroyed as a result of Bertha's storm surge, and buildings across the eastern portion of the state were significantly damaged. Moderate rainfall spread across much of the Mid-Atlantic and Northeast as Bertha moved towards the north, along with winds in excess of tropical storm force. In total, twelve fatalities were caused by Hurricane Bertha, primarily in Florida from rough seas.

Meteorological history

On July 1, 1996, a tropical wave emerged off of the coast of Africa. The disturbance moved westward, and on July 5, it strengthened into a tropical depression in the central Atlantic. The depression tracked westward across the open waters of the Atlantic along the western periphery of a subtropical ridge. Later that day, the depression was upgraded to a tropical storm and was named Bertha. Over the next three days, Bertha tracked west-northwest while gradual intensification was occurring. On July 7, Bertha was upgraded to a hurricane with sustained winds of  while east of Guadeloupe.

The next day, the center of circulation passed over Antigua as Bertha traversed the extreme northeastern portion of the Caribbean Sea causing moderate to minor damages. After that, Bertha passed rapidly in the southern portion of Sint Maarten. Because the highest winds were located on the northeastern portion of the circulation, Puerto Rico received only tropical storm force winds near 50 mph.

On July 12, Bertha made landfall between Wrightsville Beach and Topsail Beach. Bertha lost hurricane intensity just after landfall. It moved north, and lost all of its tropical characteristics by July 14. However, the storm's extratropical remnant continued moving northeastward for another several days, before dissipating on July 18, near Greenland.

Impact

U.S. Virgin Islands and Puerto Rico
Two boats were destroyed, five were grounded, and nine others washed ashore. One injury occurred in Coral Bay as a man rode out the storm in his sailboat. The Federal Emergency Management Agency (FEMA) reported that 1,415 homes were damaged, 43 of which lost their roofs. Governor Roy Schneider noted that there were at least 20 boats that blew ashore in Charlotte Amalie. Damages from the storm were estimated at $7.5 million.

The maximum rainfall reported in association with Bertha was  along the Rio Icacos in Naguabo. Although heavy rain did occur, there was no widespread or significant inland flooding reported. There were, however, several reports of swollen rivers which caused some minor flooding of low lying and urban areas; coastal flooding was reported from Carolina to Loiza along road 187.

One death is attributed to Hurricane Bertha; a tourist drowned while surfing in high seas at the Playa Azul beach area in Luquillo. Two other deaths occurred indirectly as a result of Bertha; two people died in a traffic accident while tropical storm force winds were occurring. The hardest hit area was the municipality of Culebra, where most of the damage was to agriculture and commerce. However, because damages were minimum, none of the municipalities were declared disaster areas. The Housing Department estimated damages to homes at $410,000. The agricultural damages were estimated at $6 million in the San Juan, Caguas, and Ponce Regions, mostly wind damage to coffee, plantain, and banana crops. In all, it is estimated that $7.5 million in damage in Puerto Rico were attributed to Bertha.

Elsewhere in the Caribbean
Damage throughout the country of Antigua and Barbuda was regarded as generally minor, limited to mainly 10 homes. Electricity was restored by July 9. The Bahamas and the north coast of the Dominican Republic likely suffered light damage, though no damage figures are available for either.

United States

Southeastern United States

In Florida, a man was caught in rip currents offshore Jacksonville Beach and drowned. Farther south, swells also lashed the coasts of Broward, Miami-Dade, and Palm Beach Counties. Throughout the area, beach patrols and lifeguards made dozens of rescues. Two other people drowned from rip currents in separate incidents at an unguarded section of Miami Beach. An additional fatality occurred in the state after a military jet evacuating the storm crashed into a house.

Minimal impact was reported in Georgia, mainly limited to about $2 million in lost revenue for local businesses along the east coast of the state. In South Carolina, gale-force winds affected the coast, while  tides caused minor beach erosion.

North Carolina
Several fishing piers and marinas were destroyed along with numerous boats. Several locations recorded hurricane-force wind gust, with the highest being  at Frying Pan Shoals. Tropical storm force winds were observed throughout much of eastern North Carolina.

In Onslow County, 199 structures were destroyed, of which 117 were mobile homes. In New Hanover County, 1,750 buildings sustained damage. In Kure Beach, near where Bertha made landfall, 3 homes had their roofs blown off and all structures in the area were damaged. Losses in New Hanover reached about $19 million. In Pender County, 40 homes were undermined by beach erosion and four were destroyed. Damages in the county were estimated at $14.5 million. Agricultural losses in Wayne, Wilson, and Johnston Counties were estimated at $21 million.

Mid-Atlantic

As Bertha passed through southeastern Virginia and the lower Delmarva Peninsula, strong feeder bands produced strong wind gusts in the area. In King George County, a roof was blown onto a tree, while a garage collapsed and a metal shed was demolished. Near the community of Butzner Corner in Stafford County, siding was ripped from a few homes, one of which also suffered damage to the skylight. Falling tree limbs in Portsmouth caused temporary power outages. Over  of rain fell across southeastern Virginia.

In Maryland, Bertha spawned three tornadoes along the western shore of Chesapeake Bay. The first event occurred in subdivisions behind a shopping center in California, where 30 homes sustained minor to moderate damage, mainly siding, shutters, and shingles. A few fences were blown down, with a portion of one residence's fence blown through another home's bedroom window. A roof was partially torn from a home, with some ceiling and deck damage. A shed reportedly was flipped onto an unoccupied automobile. Other cars were slightly damaged by fallen limbs. Approximately 20 trees were snapped. The second tornado was spawned in Charlotte Hall; the twister stripped off a large portion of a barn's sheet metal roof. A garage containing auto repair machinery collapsed, and an adjacent home's brick chimney was also toppled. Several trees were snapped or uprooted. Eight homes sustained minor damage, with three others suffering moderate to major damage.

A third tornado struck extreme northwest Calvert County, causing the roof and a chimney of a predominantly wood-constructed farm house to collapse. The home was temporarily uninhabitable. At least one wall was near failure. A second chimney collapsed at a nearby home. Numerous trees were snapped or uprooted along the path, and one home in an estates subdivision sustained damage to its gutters. Another tornado was spawned in Madison in Dorchester County, which is on the eastern shore of Chesapeake Bay. The twister downed numerous trees and power lines blown down, resulting in scattered property damage and power outages. Strong winds felled trees and large limbs, damaging five homes in Calvert County. The combination of rain, gusty winds, and isolated severe weather left approximately 45,000 customers without electricity on the western shore.

Along the coast of Delaware, tidal flooding was minor and occurred on Route 54 near Fenwick Island. Two days before Bertha arrived, rough surf resulted in 40 water rescues at Bethany Beach. Seashore state campgrounds were closed and shelters were set up, but less than 100 persons used them. This inundated some areas with poor drainage, though the only river to flood was the Christina River in New Castle County. Wind gusts reached  in Dover. Throughout the state, 3,200 homes lost electricity, but many for only eight hours. At Bethany Beach, a few poles were snapped and tree limbs came down. Strong winds downed trees in Clayton, blocking three roads. The roof was blown off one house and the porch roof was blown off another. Several poles were also knocked down. Flying debris caused damage to several other garages, homes, and porches. Near Blackiston, a large storage shed was destroyed.

Winds downed weak trees and limbs, with one heavily damaging a house in Plymouth Township. Due to winds and severe thunderstorms associated with Bertha, approximately 60,000 customers lost electricity, primarily in Bucks County.

Some tree limbs and weak trees were downed, closing Second Street in Cape May. Approximately 95,000 homes lost power. However, since most of the rain fell during a 12‑ to 18‑hour period, there was mainly urban and poor drainage flooding. A few water rescues of trapped motorists occurred. Some minor tidal flooding occurred in Cape May County. A 41-year-old man from New Egypt drowned while surfing at Ocean Beach. In addition, three firefighters rescued a man in Barnegat Bay who was attempting to tie down his boat.

Bertha produced rain and strong gusty winds in southern and eastern New York. In the latter, up to  fell in Greenwood Lake, with low-lying and poor drainage areas, streams, and rivers across the area flooded. A portion of Interstate 278 in Kings County and Interstate 495 in Nassau County were also inundated. In Dutchess County, swollen small streams caused flooding in Beacon, Rhinebeck and Wappinger. The town of Claverack in Columbia County was flooded when the Claverack Creek exceeded its banks. Cranse and Jansen Kill Creeks also inundated. Numerous roads were closed throughout the county, including Route 22. In Ulster County, widespread flooding occurred in New Paltz and Kingston. At the latter, seven families were evacuated. Substantial flooding occurred along the waterfront in Kingston due to high flows from the Wallkill Creek, Rondout Creek, and high tides in the Hudson River. Numerous roads were closed throughout the county including routes 32, 32A, and 213 and county routes 6 and 30.

In Albany County, many roads and small streams were flooded. Flooding was most severe in Bethlehem, New Scotland, and Rensselaerville. Road inundation also occurred in Schenectady County, where the Schoharie Creek rose  over flood stage. In Greene County, widespread flooding was reported in New Baltimore and Windham. A number of roads were closed throughout the county, including routes 32A and 296, as well as county routes 6 and 61. Several small bridges were washed out especially in Round Top, while minor flooding occurred along the Schoharie Creek. In Schoharie County roads were flooded and a bridge was washed out in Middleburg. Many town roads were washed out in Blenheim including Route 30. Flooding also occurred along the Schoharie Creek. In Rensselaer County, several roads were covered with water. Scattered power outages also occurred across eastern New York, when strong winds downed water-laden tree branches onto wires.

New England
Street inundation and minor river flooding occurred along the Park River in the Hartford area. Several roads and streams were flooded in Litchfield County. Scattered power outages also occurred due to strong winds downing water-laden tree branches onto wires. Flooding was reported in the city of Ridgefield in Fairfield County, as well as areas along the Mill River in New Haven County.

Throughout the state, trees and tree limbs fell onto power lines, leaving up to 32,000 customers without electricity. Much of the power was restored within 12 hours. Minor beach erosion occurred along the exposed shores. Tropical Storm Bertha became only the tenth tropical cyclone in the 20th century to impact Rhode Island

In Massachusetts, Bertha brought a period of rainfall, high winds, and minor coastal flooding. Small streams flooded in Berkshire, Franklin, Hampden, Hampshire, and southern Worcester counties. Street washouts were reported in southern Worcester County. Gusts up to  occurred along the south coast from Cape Cod and the Islands to Westport, downing tree limbs and power lines, which caused power outages in the areas. This inundated coastal roads for a few hours and flooded several marinas, causing minor damage to some boats.

In southern Vermont, rainfall was generally . Several roads and streams were flooded throughout the region, including low-lying areas adjacent to the Hoosic River in Bennington County. Strong winds downed water-laden tree branches onto wires, causing scattered power outages across the area. Further north, dirt roads around Ludlow were washed out and a mudslide was reported on Route 14 near Royalton. A combination of gusty winds and rainfall caused scattered power outages.

Impact from the storm in Maine was minor. Some ditch erosion, inundation of low-lying areas, streets, and basement flooding occurred. Power outages were reported in Lewiston and some adjacent towns. Route 219 was left impassable in Oxford County due to flooding in several locations. Overflowing streams inundated several streets in Abbot. Two bridges were damaged in Anson. Many roads in the Camden area were washed out. Two people were injured when the car they were riding in struck a  boulder, which had fallen onto the roadway because of the heavy rains. In the Castine area, streams that overflowed their banks flooded roadways. Minor flooding occurred along the Kennebec River in Kennebec County.

Canada
Shortly after becoming extratropical, the remnants of Bertha entered Canada through New Brunswick. In the southern portions of the province, the storm dropped  of rain, causing minor flooding. In Quebec,  on rainfall fell in Iles de la Madeleine, which was the highest precipitation total in Canada associated with the storm. The remnants of Bertha proceeded to move over Prince Edward Island. There, winds reached , which caused power outages at 100 homes in Wood Islands and felled trees. As a result, widespread power outages were reported in Amherst, Antigonish, Bedford, Halifax, Wolfville, Truro, and Yarmouth, Nova Scotia. During the late hours of July 14 and early on July 15, the remnants of Bertha moved across Newfoundland. Due to wet conditions and strong winds, officials of the annual Corner Brook Triathlon cancelled the bicycling portion of the event.

See also

Other storms of the same name
Hurricane Bonnie (1998)
 Hurricane Fran (1996)
 Hurricane Isabel (2003)
 Hurricane Irene (2011)
 Hurricane Isaias (2020)
 List of North Carolina hurricanes (1980–1999)
 List of New Jersey hurricanes

References

External links

 NHC Hurricane Bertha Preliminary Report
 NWS Service Assessment
 NOAA North Carolina hurricanes: Bertha

Bertha (1996)
Bertha (1996)
Bertha (1996)
Bertha (1996)
Bertha (1996)
Bertha (1996)
Bertha (1996)
Bertha (1996)
Bertha (1996)
Bertha (1996)
Bertha (1996)
Bertha (1996)
Bertha (1996)
Bertha (1996)
Bertha (1996)
Bertha (1996)
Bertha (1996)
1996 in North Carolina
1996 in Puerto Rico
1996 natural disasters in the United States
1996 in the United States Virgin Islands
July 1996 events